Mogens Pedersen can refer to:

 Mogens E. Pedersen (1924–2014), a Danish journalist
 Mogens Pedersen (rower, born 1937), a Danish Olympic rower
 Mogens Pedersen (rower, born 1944), a Danish Olympic rower

See also
 Mogens Pedersøn (1583–1623), a Danish composer